The 1960–61 Serie A season was the 27th season of the Serie A, the top level of ice hockey in Italy. Four teams participated in the league, and SG Cortina won the championship by defeating HC Diavoli Milano in the final.

Regular season

Final 
 SG Cortina - HC Diavoli Milano 4:0

External links
 Season on hockeytime.net

1960–61 in Italian ice hockey
Serie A (ice hockey) seasons
Italy